Rocking Time is a reggae album by Jamaican musician Burning Spear, released in 1974 (see 1974 in music) on the Studio One label.

His second album for Studio One, Rocking Time featured bass guitarist Leroy Sibbles and drummer Leroy "Horsemouth" Wallace. The album was described by Allmusic as "cosmic reggae at its rawest" and "the very epitome of conscious music".

Track listing
"Call On You"
"Foggy Road"
"Swell Headed"
"Girls Like You"
"Old Time Saying"
"Bad To Worst"
"What A Happy Day"
"This Race"
"Walla Walla"
"Rocking Time"
"Weeping And Wailing"
"Mamie"

Credits
All Songs Written By Winston Rodney and Clement Dodd
Published by Jamrec Music Publishers
Recorded at Jamaica Recording and Publishing Studio
Recording Engineering:  Clement Dodd
Produced & Arranged by Clement Dodd

References

Burning Spear albums
1974 albums